Agnieszka Renc (born 9 January 1986 in Warsaw) is a competitive rower from Poland.

Competitions 
 2009 World Rowing Championships
 2012 World Rowing Championships
 2009 European Rowing Championships
 2010 European Rowing Championships

References

External links 
 

1986 births
Living people
Polish female rowers
Rowers from Warsaw
World Rowing Championships medalists for Poland
European Rowing Championships medalists